The 36th Combined Arms Army is a combined arms (field) army of the Russian Ground Forces, part of the Eastern Military District (Military Unit Number 05776).

History 
The army was formed in 1997 from the 55th Army Corps at Borzya in the Siberian Military District, which had been formed from the previous Soviet 36th Army. The army participated in exercises "Baikal-2006", "Vostok-2007", and "Vostok-2010". In February 2009, the army headquarters was relocated to Ulan-Ude.

Composition 
 5th Guards Tank Tatsinskaya Red Banner Order of Suvorov Brigade (Ulan Ude, Divisionnaya, MUN 46108)
 37th Guards Motor Rifle Don Budapest Red Banner Order of the Red Star Brigade (Kyakhta, MUN 69647)
 30th Artillery Brigade (MUN 62048)
 103rd Rocket Brigade (Ulan-Ude, MUN 47130)
 1723rd Anti-Aircraft Rocket Regiment (Jida)
 26th NBC Protection Regiment (Onokhoy, MUN 62563)
 75th Headquarters Brigade (Ulan-Ude, MUN 01229)
 and others

Commanders 
 Lieutenant General Aleksandr Petrovich Kolmakov (August 1998 – July 2000)
 Lieutenant General Hakim Ismagilovich Mirzazyanov (July 2000 – November 2003)
 Lieutenant General Vladimir Valentinovich Chirkin (November 2003 – February 2007)
 Lieutenant General Vladimir Borisovich Zarudnitsky (February 2007 – April 2009)
 Lieutenant General Vladimir Genrikhovich Tsilko (June 2009 – February 2012)
 Lieutenant General Oleg Leontevich Makarevich (February 2012 – February 2013)
 Major/Lieutenant General Mikhail Yurevich Teplinsky (February 2013 – May 2015)
 Major General Dmitry Ivanovich Kovalenko (May 2015 – September 2017)
 Lieutenant General Mikhail Yakovlevich Nosulev (October 2017 – January 2020)
 Major/Lieutenant General Valery Nikolayevich Solodchuk (January 2020 – present)

Russo-Ukrainian War 

In the context of the 2022 Russian invasion of Ukraine, elements of the 36th Army (including units from the 5th Tank Brigade, 37th Motor Rifle Brigade and 103rd Rocket Brigade) had been deployed to Belarus and were participating in active operations, mainly in the area West of Kyiv.

References 

Armies of the Russian Federation
Military units and formations established in 1997
Ulan-Ude